Osvaldo Roque Gonçalves da Cruz (born March 25, 1970 in Luanda), nicknamed Joni, is a retired Angolan football midfielder.

International career
Joni has been a member of his national team, and was called up to the 1996 African Cup of Nations.

National team statistics

International goals
Scores and results list Angola's goal tally first.

References

External links
 

1970 births
Living people
Footballers from Luanda
1996 African Cup of Nations players
Angola international footballers
Angolan footballers
C.D. Tondela players
S.C. Salgueiros players
Académico de Viseu F.C. players
União Montemor players
Atlético Sport Aviação players
S.C. Olhanense players
G.D. Sagrada Esperança players
S.L. Benfica (Luanda) players
Estrela Clube Primeiro de Maio players
Atlético Petróleos de Luanda players
Primeira Liga players
Liga Portugal 2 players
Girabola players
Association football midfielders
Angolan expatriate footballers
Angolan expatriate sportspeople in Portugal
Angolan expatriate sportspeople in Qatar
Expatriate footballers in Portugal
Expatriate footballers in Qatar